Anita Jordán (1917-1946) was an Argentine film and stage actress.

Selected filmography
 Only the Valiant (1940)
 The Englishman of the Bones (1940)

References

Bibliography
 Goble, Alan. The Complete Index to Literary Sources in Film. Walter de Gruyter, 1999.

External links

1917 births
1946 deaths
Argentine film actresses
Argentine stage actresses
People from Santa Fe, Argentina